Dermea is a genus of fungi in the family Dermateaceae. The genus contains 22 species.

Species 
Dermea acerina
Dermea ariae
Dermea balsamea
Dermea bicolor
Dermea brenckleana
Dermea cerasi
Dermea chionanthi
Dermea craterium
Dermea cydoniae
Dermea grovesii
Dermea hamamelidis
Dermea libocedri
Dermea livida
Dermea molliuscula
Dermea morthieri
Dermea padi
Dermea peckiana
Dermea piceina
Dermea pinicola
Dermea populea
Dermea prunastri
Dermea pruni
Dermea pseudotsugae
Dermea rhytidiformans
Dermea spiraeae
Dermea tetrasperma
Dermea tulasnei
Dermea viburni

See also 

 List of Dermateaceae genera

References

External links 

 Dermea at Index Fungorum

Dermateaceae genera